Sound Off may refer to:

 Sound Off (film), a 1952 comedy starring Mickey Rooney
 Sound Off (The Country Gentlemen album), 1971
 Sound Off (The Rubyz album)
 "Sound Off", an episode of Hi Hi Puffy AmiYumi
 "Sound Off" (song), a song by Trapt
 "Sound Off" (Vaughn Monroe song), a song by Vaughn Monroe